"Capsize" is a single by American duo Frenship, released on June 18, 2016. It features the vocal collaboration of American songwriter Emily Warren. The song first gained prominence on the music streaming platform Spotify before hitting charts around the world, reaching over 500 million streams since release, making the song a viral hit. The music video, directed by Andrew Donoho, featured two dancers standing at opposite ends of a lake who proceed to dance on the water.

Charts

Weekly charts

Year-end charts

Certifications

Release history

References

External links
 

2016 songs
2016 singles
Frenship songs
Columbia Records singles
Electropop songs
Emily Warren songs
Songs written by Babydaddy
Songs written by Emily Warren